24 Hours or Twenty-Four Hours is a long-running, late evening, daily news magazine programme that aired on BBC1. It focused on analysis and criticism of current affairs and featured in-depth short documentary films that set the style for current affairs magazine programmes. 24 Hours launched on 4 October 1965 and focused on investigative journalism. The programme's main presenter was Cliff Michelmore.

History
The programme brought together the production teams from two BBC television programmes: Gallery, a weekly political programme, and Tonight the early evening magazine programme. The original editors were Tony Whitby from Tonight and Derrick Amoore from Gallery but it later came to be led by Anthony Smith.

The presenter Cliff Michelmore was the first lead anchor for 24 Hours. With him in the studio were Kenneth Allsop, Michael Barratt and Robert McKenzie, a professor of politics at the London School of Economics (LSE). Towards the end of its run David Dimbleby became the main presenter.

Style
24 Hours was conceived with the intention of being very different from other current affairs programmes at the time. Critical to the point of confrontational, it abandoned the orthodox reverential rules of engagement with politicians and took a tougher, more modern approach to interviews. 24 Hours used a combination of panel discussions and studio debates, usually with an invited "expert" audience. The programme also featured filmed items or "packages" presented by its reporters Michael Parkinson, Fyfe Robertson, Michael Aspel, Julian Pettifer, Bernard Falk and David Jessel, among others. It helped establish an approach to television current affairs and is in many ways the forerunner to BBC Two's present day current affairs flagship Newsnight.

Production paperwork, Radio Times and BBC Archive library all list the title "Twenty-Four Hours" in words, while the programmes logo used numerals "24 Hours".

Scheduling
24 Hours originally had a fluid start time somewhere after 10pm. The decision to give it a fixed start time of 9:55pm was taken in 1967 following the establishment of ITN's peak time News at Ten programme. However, on Wednesdays it would begin at 10:20pm "in order that The Wednesday Play may begin ... and run its full 75 minutes."

Huw Wheldon, then BBC Controller of Programmes, said 24 Hours "has become such a valuable part of our coverage of national and international affairs, that we feel we must give it a regular and predictable placing. David Attenborough ... who wants to put his BBC2 programmes on in such a way as to provide real choice for viewers, is driven mad by Twenty-Four Hours which has had to keep jumping about all over the place. Now we've got Twenty-Four Hours fixed at five-to-ten, we can handle all that!".

24 Hours run ended on 14 July 1972.

Studio presenters
Kenneth Allsop
Michael Barratt
David Dimbleby
Robert McKenzie
Cliff Michelmore

Reporters
Michael Aspel
Michael Parkinson
Julian Pettifer
Fyfe Robertson

Footnotes

External links

1965 British television series debuts
1972 British television series endings
1960s British documentary television series
1970s British documentary television series
BBC television documentaries
English-language television shows